Miloš Antić (born 3 July 1989) is a Serbian football midfielder who plays for Dinamo Vranje in Serbian SuperLiga. He is the son of Dinamo Vranje manager and former footballer Dragan Antić.

References

External links
 
 Profile at srbijafudbal.com

People from Vranje
1989 births
Living people
Association football defenders
Serbian footballers
FK Dinamo Vranje players
FK Radnik Surdulica players
FK Napredak Kruševac players
SV Waldhof Mannheim players
Serbian SuperLiga players
Serbian First League players
Serbian expatriate footballers
Serbian expatriate sportspeople in Germany
Expatriate footballers in Germany